George H. Burgess is an ichthyologist and fisheries biologist with the Florida Museum of Natural History, University of Florida. He is the former director of the International Shark Attack File and author/coauthor of numerous books and papers on sharks and other fish.

Burgess has appeared on multiple Shark Week programs on Discovery Channel and on Nick Frost's Danger! 50,000 Volts!.

George Burgess retired in 2017. The Florida Museum of Natural History highlighted that he "always stressed the importance of shark conservation."

Taxon named in his honor 
Etmopterus burgessi, sometimes known as the broad-snout lanternshark, is named for him.

References

External links

American marine biologists
University of Florida faculty
1949 births
Living people